Schlagbauer is a German language habitational surname for a peasant (German: Bauer) living in an area near a forest that was made arable by cutting wood (German: Holzschlagen "chopping wood"). Notable people with the name include:

  (1913–2001), German educationist
 Christoph Schlagbauer (1989), Austrian triathlete
 Rainer Schlagbauer (1949), Austrian former footballer
 Walter Schlagbauer (1960), Austrian sailor

References 

German-language surnames
Toponymic surnames
Occupational surnames
Surnames of Austrian origin